Judy Farrell (née Hayden; May 11, 1938) is an American actress most noted for her role as Nurse Able on the television comedy series M*A*S*H. She performed small roles in several other television series, then later wrote 13 episodes for the soap opera Port Charles.

Life
Farrell was born Judy Hayden and raised in Quapaw, Oklahoma. She graduated from Oklahoma State University with a fine arts degree in theater.

While studying for a master's degree at UCLA in 1961, she met actor Mike Farrell. She worked as a high school English and Drama teacher at Laguna Beach High School in Laguna Beach, California. In August 1963, she married Farrell with whom she subsequently had two children, Erin and Michael. In the 1960s, she and Farrell performed together at the Laguna Playhouse. They divorced in the early 1980s.

The Farrells' marriage was worked into the script of one episode of M*A*S*H: In the episode "The Colonel's Horse," Mike's character B.J. Hunnicutt said his wife Peg (played by Catherine Bergstrom in two onscreen appearances and a few photographs) was from Judy's hometown of Quapaw, and that her father's name was Floyd Hayden.. His daughter in the show was also named Erin, as his real life daughter.

References

External links
 

American soap opera writers
American television actresses
1938 births
Living people
American women television writers
20th-century American actresses
Women soap opera writers
21st-century American women